Katha Ankahee is an Indian television drama series. Produced by Sunjoy Waddhwa under the banner of Sphere Origins. An official Hindi remake of Turkish series One Thousand and One Nights, better known as Arabian Nights. It stars Aditi Sharma and Adnan Khan. It premiered on 5 December 2022 on Sony Entertainment Television, and streams digitally on SonyLIV.

Plot
Katha is a single mother whose primary job is architecture besides numerous secondary jobs while Viaan is calculated and cold hearted. Katha's son Aarav is ailing from a blood cancer whose expensive treatment compels her to submit to her boss' request of spending a night with him

Cast

Main
 Aditi Sharma as Katha Singh Garewal – Aditya's widow; Aarav's mother (2022–present)
 Adnan Khan as Viaan Raghuwanshi – Teji and Viraj's son; Katha's boss (2022–present)

Recurring
 Ajinkya Mishra as Aarav Garewal – Katha and Aditya's son (2022–present)
 Samar Vermani as Ehsan Contractor – Salim and Farah's son; Viaan's friend (2022–present)
 Preeti Amin as Neerja – Aarav's donor; Varun and Rajat's mother (2022–present)
 Bidisha Ghosh Sharma as Teji Raghuwanshi – Viraj's widow; Farah's friend; Viaan's mother (2022–present)
 Priyamvada Singh as Farah Contractor – Salim's widow; Teji's friend; Ehsan's mother (2022–present)
 Sheen Dass as Rewa – Katha's friend (2022–present)
 Reeta Prajapati as Falguni Ben – Katha's neighbour (2022–present) 
 Vinay Rohrra as Aditya "Adi" Garewal – Kavita and Kailash's elder son; Yuvraj's brother; Katha's husband; Aarav's father (dead; in flashback) (2022)
 Gireesh Sahdev as Kailash Garewal – Kavita's husband; Aditya and Yuvraj's father; Kiara, Aarna and Aarav's grandfather (2022–present)
 Jyoti Gauba as Kavita Garewal – Kailash's wife; Aditya and Yuvraj's mother; Kiara, Aarna and Aarav's grandmother (2022–present)
 Vishal Malhotra as Yuvraj Garewal – Kavita and Kailash's younger son; Aditya's brother; Reet's husband; Kiara and Aarna's father (2022–present)
 Jasveenn Kaur as Reet Garewal – Yuvraj's wife; Kiara and Aarna's mother (2022–present)
 Himanshu Manek as Jitesh "Jeetu" Patel – Manu's husband; Viaan's employee (2022–present)
 Priti Narnaware as Amrita Mehra (2022)
 Manoj Chandila as Anirudh Verma – Pyramid Global Architecture Limited (MD) (2022–present)
 Vishal Gandhi as Dr. Amit Rawal – Hematologist; Aarav's doctor (cameo appearance) (2022–2023)
 Astha Agarwal as Meera; Katha's colleague; the other woman in Yuvraj's life (2023–present)

Production

Casting
Initially, Mohit Malik was in talks to play male lead "Viaan", but couldn't join due to his prior commitments.

Gashmeer Mahajani was also approached to play the male lead, but he refused. He revealed that he regretted rejecting the role. 

Aditi Sharma as Katha, and Adnan Khan as Viaan were signed as the lead.

Samar Vermani and Sheen Dass was cast as the other lead.

In November 2022, it was confirmed Vishal Gandhi had a cameo appearance in the show.

Development
The series was announced by Sphere Origins for Sony Entertainment Television in October 2022. It is the remake of Kanal D's popular Turkish soap opera Binbir Gece.

The series marks comeback for Adnan Khan and Aditi Sharma into fiction after COVID-19 pandemic and their first collaboration.

Filming
The series is set in Mumbai, shooting began in November 2022 and  mainly shot at the Film City, Mumbai.

Release
The teaser of the series was released on 14 October 2022. It replaced Yashomati Maiyaa Ke Nandlala from 5 December 2022.

Reception

Critical reception
Times Of India commented on Sharma and Khan for "seamlessly fit[ting] into their parts", and particularly noted the dialogue, the costuming and "[e]ven the Mumbai apartments" in which the production is filmed, but nonetheless faulted the program as "too slow with very few cheerful moments".

See also  
 List of programs broadcast by Sony Entertainment Television

References

External links 
 
 Katha Ankahee on SonyLIV

2022 Indian television series debuts
2020s Indian television series
Indian drama television series
Hindi-language television shows
Sony Entertainment Television original programming
Television shows set in Mumbai
Indian television series based on non-Indian television series
Non-Turkish television series based on Turkish television series